El embajador de la India is a 1986 Colombian comedy film directed by Mario Ribero Ferreira starring Hugo Gomez, Olga Lucía Alvira  and José María Arzuaga. The story was based in a real event of Jaime Florez, an unemployed and former seminarist teacher that traveling for Neiva and using his knowledge about eastern cultures, makes a pass for the ambassador of the India.

Is considered a classic comedy Colombian film.

Plot 
Traveling in a chiva bus in Huila Department, Colombia, Jaime Florez (Hugo Gomez), an unemployed ex-seminarian and a fat liar travels with course not known in full-time of nap after the lunch. The vehicle on the road collects two traders who immediately engage in conversation with Jaime, who speaks to them in English into believing that it is an Indian immigrant who works in Colombia and his house is damaged in El Espinal. The bus stops in the village Garzón, and the two traders believe that Jaime is indeed the Indian Ambassador in Colombia so they decide to take it to the best hotel in town. Once there Jaime registers with the hotel as 'Maharaja Rama Ahujama' and asks the two dealers to keep their identity secret apparent.

The two traders break their promise and come to the store of José María, a fine clothing merchant who doubts the veracity of what his colleagues have therefore called the governor of the department who also doubts in principle but he thinks that the ambassador is of unknown quantity into the town thinking that it was sent in order that both the town and the country stay in ridiculously and therefore they decide to attend to it with honors. The governor accompanied by the mayor of Garzón and the secretary of the government of the town, comes to the room of the hotel where there is Jaime who is at this moment taking a bath laughing at the misunderstanding, but Jaime still pretending to be the Indian Ambassador receives reluctantly authorities believing the mistake had been discovered but seeing that the whole town had believed he was ambassador decides to continue his hoax. The governor warns the supposed ambassador that it will give him the attention that it deserves. Jaime is shaved and then thin clothes and several turbans are given to him, and on the same night at the country club a welcome in his honor, though with little difficulty as the 'ambassador' for being India, therefore, was vegetarian so the two traders get a giant salad which is given to Jaime by the mayor's daughter to him who does to him an Indian dance in his honor, criticized by the daughter of the governor and his mother. The daughter of the governor gives the key to the city to the 'ambassador' Jaime is interested in her and afterward, while she was sleeping she dreams of the 'ambassador' in India being also attracted to him. In full dawn, Jaime tries to flee from the people but it is followed by a car that turns out to be Amilcar, an old friend of Jaime in the seminary and who would be the knowledgeable only one of his secret. Amilcar accompanied by Jaime and a singer comes to a holiday for the whole night.

The next morning, the settlers and the governor see a rope made of sheets from the room of the 'ambassador' (with whom Jaime had escaped) and believes he was kidnapped. But a few minutes later Jaime arrives with signs of drunkenness and at once it is taken to his room the governor thinking that his supposed captors had drunk it the previous night, orders to put his room in custody. Jaime still in the pool surrounded by the village women pretends not to be offended by the supposed kidnapping last night and called to his room in order to take their order measures arguing the traditional dress of India for them. In his room, Jaime with his meter takes measured several attractive women but the fat women and not so attractive ask them to write down their measurements. To the room there comes the daughter of the mayor to whom Jaime feels attracted but Jaime feels furthermore attracted to Silvia, the daughter of the governor. The wife of the governor gets angry on having seen the women's row that they wanted to see the 'ambassador' and observes as the man it was trying to seduce Silvia, for what Jaime confesses being in love with her and the piece of gossip leaked out for the whole people.

In the night and in a bar in the town, Amilcar and Jaime share laughs when this one finalizes it tells him the moment in which it took the measurements to the women. The other night at the club, another party was even pretending to be ambassador Jaime dancing with Silvia shares is performed, but among the guests, a man who turned out to be ex-classmate Jaime recognized him, and tries to warn the police captain the police but he doesn't believe him and orders arrest him believing he's drunk amid shouts the man is screaming his identity apart from that Jaime has a mole behind his right ear and years ago in a fight, Jaime had hit her in the face with a shoe for being a gossip. Jaime speaking English denies knowing the man and the authorities try to apologize and continue the party, while Jaime surreptitiously hides his mole. The ex-mate is brought to the municipal judge who gives him conditional freedom but in exchange doesn't approach the 'ambassador'. The authorities to apologize for the happened the previous night, decide to take the 'ambassador' to San Agustín Archaeological Park. In another party tonight, Amilcar is aware of the difficulty of deception Jaime seeing that it was even more guarded risk of being betrayed and also that Jaime was falling in love with Silvia, so Amilcar idea to give a false telegram to Jaime as ambassador to go to Bogota and then lose that people. Against his will on the following morning, Jaime is taken to San Agustín, at the moment in which Amilcar was trying to give him the telegram, but even Jaime like that manages to say his whereabouts to Amilcar and to both merchants. Jaime during the trip enjoys Silvia's company beside intoning O sole mio. While on the other hand, their ex-mate of Jaime manages to enter to the same hotel as a guest and bribes one of the workers in order that it was giving to him the key to the room of the 'ambassador'. In San Agustín, Jaime is forced to camp and hear the guided tour of the park and that night Jaime has nightmares of his companions laughing while offering him fruits and Silvia seducing him meanwhile she was running naked in the park and ended Jaime hanged by his own turban. Understanding that his lie at any time going to crumble about thinking about how to escape while his former partner of James after entering his room manages to get his identification card making also confirms the identity of fraud. Jaime tries to have relations with Silvia but the notice of the merchants of the telegram does that the governor plans the trip to Bogota when Jaime comes to the hotel he is immediately arrested and Jaime is bored with his own lie confirming his true identity.

As a result of the collapse of his lie, Jaime is ridiculed by people, Silvia cries after being disappointed in love with the false ambassador, the two traders are beaten and vetoed by José María, the seller of fine clothing. Finally, the municipal judge frees Jaime as never defrauded anyone because Amilcar paid the hotel bill and Jaime meanwhile had returned the clothes but ordered that Jaime and two merchants leave the village in the same way in who had arrived. Ironically Jaime is fired with a standing ovation organized by Amilcar. In the end, the credits say that a true ambassador arrived in town but the authorities and the people told him 'go fuck'.

Cast 
 Hugo Gomez.... Jaime Florez Torres 'Maharajá Rama Ahujama, the Indian ambassador'
 Olga Lucía Alvira....Silvia, Governor's daughter
 Manuel Pachón....Governor of Huila
 Lucero Gómez.... Governor's wife
 Rafaél Bohorquez....Municipal judge
 Edgardo Román....Amilkar
 José María Arzuaga....José María, owner of 'El Marquéz' fine clothing

References

External links 

1986 comedy films
1986 films
Colombian comedy films
Films set in Colombia
1980s Spanish-language films